Moisés Zamora is a Mexican-American writer, director, and producer. He is best known as the creator of the Netflix's Selena: The Series. He was a staff writer for American Crime and Star.

Early life
Zamora was born in Guadalajara, Mexico, and immigrated to California at the age of 11. He is a graduate of Brown University, majoring in International Relations.

Filmography

Awards and nominations

References

External links
 

Living people
American male screenwriters
American television directors
Year of birth missing (living people)
Brown University alumni